Nakpanduri is a village in Bunkpurugu-Nakpanduri District, a district in the North East Region of north Ghana adjacent to the border with Togo.

culture

References 

Populated places in the Northern Region (Ghana)